Lake Päijänne is the second largest lake in Finland. The lake drains into the Gulf of Finland via the Kymi River. The major islands are from north to south Vuoritsalo, Muuratsalo, Onkisalo, Judinsalo, Edessalo, Taivassalo, Haukkasalo, Vehkasalo, Mustassalo, Virmailansaari and Salonsaari. The largest island is Virmailansaari. The word saari means an island. Salo once meant a great island, nowadays it means a great forest area.

The largest city on the shores of Päijänne is Jyväskylä in the North. The city of Lahti is connected to Päijänne through Lake Vesijärvi and Vääksy canal.

An underground aqueduct, Päijänne Water Tunnel, connects the lake to Vantaa, providing the Greater Helsinki area with water. The deepest point in any lake in Finland is located in Päijänne.

The name of Lake Päijänne comes possibly from a Pre-Finno-Ugric substrate language.

Transportation

Päijänne is a famous boating, canoeing and sailing attraction. Construction of canals connecting Päijänne to the Baltic Sea has been discussed for decades. Nevertheless, the plan is still to be materialized.

Until the 1940s Lake Päijänne was a major transportation channel in the Central Finland. Numerous ships transported passengers and freight between the villages and cities on the shores of Päijänne. Nowadays, passenger transportation is rather a tourist attraction on the lakelands than the fastest way connecting the cities and villages. One of the most popular passenger transportation routes in summertime is between the cities of Lahti and Jyväskylä.

Tourism
There are 16,000 cottages on the shores of Päijänne. Most of the cottages are private owned and have a separate sauna cottage.

In addition to cottage tourism Päijänne attracts fishing, sailing, canoeing, rowing, paddling, trekking, ice-skating, snow mobile and nature tourists. The National Parks of Päijänne and Leivonmäki alone has tens of thousands of visitors every year.

The Clear and Drinkable Lake Päijänne South Association won a Tourism and  Environment award presented by the European Union Commission in 1995.

National Parks
Päijänne National Park is a national park in the southern parts of Lake Päijänne. It consists of 50 unbuilt islands and parts of inhabited islands.

Leivonmäki National Park is situated few kilometres North East from the Northern part of Lake Päijänne. It is one of the youngest national parks in Finland.

Cities and towns upon Lake Päijänne
From North to South
 Jyväskylä (at )
 Säynätsalo (at )
 Muurame (at )
 Toivakka (at )
 Korpilahti (at )
 Jämsä (at )
 Luhanka (at )
 Joutsa (at )
 Kuhmoinen (at )
 Sysmä (at )
 Padasjoki (at )
 Asikkala (at )

Gallery

See also
 Päijänne National Park

References

External links
 

 
Kymi basin
Landforms of Central Finland
Lakes of Joutsa
Lakes of Muurame
Lakes of Luhanka
Lakes of Jyväskylä
Lakes of Sysmä
Lakes of Padasjoki
Lakes of Jämsä